Bedworth ( or locally ) is a market town and unparished area in the borough of Nuneaton and Bedworth, Warwickshire, England.  It is situated between Coventry, 6 miles (9.5 km) to the south, and Nuneaton,  to the north. 

In the 2011 census the town had a population of 30,648.

Geography

Bedworth has six main suburban districts, namely Collycroft, Mount Pleasant, Bedworth Heath, Coalpit Field, Goodyers End and Exhall. Exhall is a generic name for the area surrounding junction 3 of the M6 motorway, comprising parts of both Bedworth and Coventry.

Bedworth is almost contiguous with Coventry, and is defined as being part of the Coventry and Bedworth Urban Area.

The River Sowe rises in Bedworth flowing through Exhall, northern and eastern Coventry, Baginton and Stoneleigh, before joining the River Avon south of Stoneleigh.

The town is locally pronounced as 'Beduth' though as Bedworth almost everywhere else.

History

Originally a small market town with Saxon origins, Bedworth was mentioned in the Domesday Book of 1086 as Bedeword. The first record of a priest at Bedworth was from 1297. The town suffered great decline as a result of the Black Death in the 14th century. In 1590, the town was described as being home to just 14 families. By 1730, Bedworth had recovered somewhat as a result of local coal mining, and was described as containing 260 houses.

Following the passage of the Five Mile Act 1665, which forbade Nonconformist church goers from assembling for worship and preaching within five miles of a corporate town such as Coventry. Bedworth, being exactly five miles from Coventry became a local centre for Nonconformists who assembled at the town. In 1686 the Reverend Julius Saunders established the Old Meeting congregation just north of the five-mile post. An old plaque that was on the mile-post can still be seen on a gate post of the Almshouses. In 1726 a Presbyterian Nonconformist chapel now of the United Reformed Church was built here which still stands, and was restored in 2012.

Bedworth developed into an industrial town in the 18th and 19th centuries, due largely to coal mining and the overspill of ribbon weaving and textile industries from nearby Coventry: Located on the Warwickshire coalfield, coal mining in the area was recorded as early as the 13th century, but grew to a large scale as a result of the industrial revolution. The industry peaked in 1939 when there were 20 pits in the area producing over 5.8 million tons of coal. The last colliery in Bedworth, Newdigate Colliery closed in 1982, and Coventry Colliery on the edge of the town closed in 1991. The ribbon weaving industry had been introduced to the area by French Huguenot immigrants in the 18th century and thrived for nearly a century, until it was largely wiped out in the 1860s following the Cobden–Chevalier Treaty which removed tariffs on imported French silks, causing enormous hardship to the town. Hat making however grew and largely replaced the ribbon trade, and lasted until the 1950s.

The opening of the Coventry Canal in 1789 and later, the Coventry to Nuneaton railway in 1850 enhanced the town's growth. More recently, the M6 motorway was opened just south of the town in 1971.

From 1894 Bedworth was a civil parish within the Foleshill Rural District. In 1928 Bedworth was incorporated as an urban district in its own right. In 1932 the urban district was enlarged by the addition of Exhall and parts of Foleshill, Astley and Walsgrave on Sowe parishes. It was further enlarged in 1938 by the addition of Bulkington. In 1974 the Bedworth Urban District was merged with the Municipal Borough of Nuneaton to create the borough of Nuneaton and Bedworth.

Features

Among the most notable buildings in Bedworth are the Nicholas Chamberlaine Almshouses on All Saints' Square in the town centre, which are built in Tudor style and date from 1840, These replaced the original buildings which had been funded by a legacy from the local benefactor Nicholas Chamberlaine (1632–1715) through his will. The almshouses were restored in the 1980s, and are now Grade II* listed.

The majority of the town centre was redeveloped in the 1960s and early-1970s, with the typical architecture of that period, and consists of a pedestrianised shopping precinct. The town centre itself contains some of the usual high street retail names as well as many charity shops, card shops and banks.

The main venue in Bedworth was the Bedworth Civic Hall which opened in 1973 and had an attached arts centre. In October 2022 the borough council announced that the Civic Hall would close permanently, citing the cost of maintaining the venue, but they stated that it would be redeveloped into a new theatre and library.

South of the town centre is the Miners' Welfare Park, which opened in 1923, originally to provide a recreation space for miners and their families. Now managed by the local council it includes playing fields, sports facilities, footpaths and gardens.

It originally had a 60,000 gallon water tank, but became obsolete in 1988, when a new water mains was installed into Bedworth. The tower is home to a pair of peregrine falcons, first noted in 1998. In 2015 it was sold to be converted into six luxury apartments.

Along Mill Street until recently were rows of former weavers' cottages which were once inhabited by Huguenot weavers. Some of these were still used as shops, although most had become derelict. They have been demolished as part of the redevelopment of Tesco.

Several years ago Bedworth Kwik Save (a 1960s steel reinforced concrete building with roof parking, known locally as the Hypermarket – the original name), was redeveloped into a new Aldi store. Next to it is a Home Bargains store. Tesco was in a similar type of building to Kwik Save, but in a brick-faced and arched windowed 1970s style, closed in January 2011, and was redeveloped into a steel-framed Tesco Extra store. Parking is at ground level, the store is on the first floor, with delivery access up a ramp to the first floor. It opened on 5 December 2011.

Bedworth has many pubs and working men's clubs: among others, the Bear and Ragged Staff, the White Horse, the Miners Arms, the Mount Pleasant, the Black Horse, the Black Bank, Saunders Hall, Collycroft Working Men's Club, Bedworth Liberal Club, Bedworth Conservative Club, the Griffin Inn, the Newdigate Arms, the Cross Keys (demolished in 2022, now Co-operative off-license), the Royal Oak, the Prince of Wales, JB's and Littleworks (reopened as Jack's Entertainment Club). Several others have closed.

The Bear and Ragged Staff being notable for formerly being Stubbs & Sons Toy Shop which opened originally at the end of World War 1 and remained a family owned business for three generations. The site was sold after the retirement of Reg Stubbs by his son to JD Wetherspoon who proceeded to renovate the old Stubbs Toy Shop into The Bear and Ragged Staff on 30 July 2001.

Bedworth also has a skate park built in the Miners' Welfare Park in 2001 after campaigning by local youngsters. Previously, most youngsters would skate in the town centre, or in the market area, much to the annoyance of residents and the local police.

A new play area, on the site of the previous aviary and paddling pool near the cricket ground within the park, was dedicated in June 2012 to Sergeant Simon 'Val' Valentine. He was born and brought up in Bedworth, a soldier of 2nd battalion Royal Regiment of Fusiliers who died in August 2009 while serving his country in Helmand Province, Afghanistan. The town centre was closed and thousands of townspeople paid their respects at Sergeant Valentine's funeral in 2009.

Economy
With most of its historic industries gone, Bedworth still has some specialist manufacturing that continues in the town; one firm in Bedworth, Toye, Kenning & Spencer, specialises in producing items such as hats and caps, banners, flags, medal ribbons and Masonic regalia.

At the Bayton Road industrial estate in Exhall is a manufacturing firm; Premiere Group, which specialises in producing sheet metal products, primarily for the automotive sector. The firm won the contract to produce 12,000 Olympic torches for the 2012 Olympic Games.

The domestic appliance insurer Domestic & General has offices in the town centre,
as does Warwickshire County Council.

Religion

Church of England
The town centre has a church dedicated to All Saint's known locally as All Saints' Parish Church (Church of England). A church has stood at the site since the 14th century, and it still retains its original tower from that period. The rest of the church has been rebuilt several times, the current building dates from the late Victorian era, when it was rebuilt during 1888-1890 out of Runcorn sandstone at a cost of £8,000 raised by public subscription. The church is grade II* listed.

Roman Catholic
St Francis of Assisi Roman Catholic Church, a prominent building in the town centre. The first church at the site opened in June 1883. Over later years, a number of additions were made, including the porch and tower. The church was made a parish church in 1919, and in September 1923 it was consecrated in its current form by Archbishop McIntyre.

In the early-1970s the interior of the church was modernised, with the tabernacle, altar, pulpit, font, Mary and Child, and the Sacred Heart and Risen Christ, all made by the noted Maltese artist and sculptor Carmel Cauchi.

The church is part of the Rugby Deanery in the Roman Catholic Archdiocese of Birmingham.

Other Christian denominations
There are also, Bedworth Methodist Church, and the United Reformed Church in Mill Street in the town centre, Bedworth Baptist Church on Coventry Road near the football ground as well as Life Church on Bulkington Road. A Kingdom Hall of Jehovah's Witnesses is in Deronda Close, behind The Newdigate Arms. Zion Baptist Church is on Newdigate Road and is a striking 1977 replacement of the original 1796 chapel on High Street, which was demolished to make way for the Civic Centre (See external links.)

Demographics
At the 2011 census, there were 30,648 residents in Bedworth in 13,299 households, and the median age of Bedworth residents was 40.

In terms of ethnicity:

91.4% of Bedworth residents were White (Comprising 89.3% White British, 1.4% Other White, and 0.6% Irish). 
5.9% were Asian (Comprising 4.6% Indian, 0.3% Chinese, 0.2% Pakistani, and 0.8% from another Asian background)
0.9% were Black (Comprising 0.6% African, 0.2% Caribbean and 0.1% other Black)
1.1% were Mixed. 
0.6% were from another ethnic group.

In terms of religion, 63.4% of Bedworth residents identified as Christian, 24.3% said they had no religion, 6.1% did not state any religion, 4.2% were Sikh, 0.9% were Hindu, 0.5% were Muslim, 0.2% were Buddhists, and 0.4% were from another religion.

Sport and leisure

Bedworth has a non-League football team Bedworth United F.C. who play at the Oval Ground. There is also a swimming club called Nuneaton and Bedworth Dolphins.

Bedworth is proud host to the Bedworth Parkrun on a Saturday and Bedworth Park 5k on a Sunday. Both of these runs are held in the Miners Welfare Park at 9am.

Armistice Day
Every year Armistice Day 11 November is well attended by the population, who gather in the town to watch the veterans' armistice parade that concludes with the laying of poppy wreaths at the war memorial, to pay their respects to those who fought and died in the armed forces. Local youth groups like the Girls' Brigade, and cadets march through the town as part of the parade, with bands playing commemorative music. Second World War Douglas C-47 Skytrain 'Dakota' military transport aircraft, also known as the civilian version Douglas DC-3, scatter remembrance poppy petals over the town, aiming at the war memorial if the weather permits. Before 2005 Spitfire fighters were used.

The flypasts were featured on the national TV news on remembrance days, but they were banned on health and safety grounds from low flying over an urban area.

Bedworth chose to keep 11 November as Armistice Day, even after 1939, when the rest of the country moved to the nearest Sunday. In more recent times, the tradition was kept up by Frank Parsons. The former Royal Marine died in 2011, but his work over the previous 25 years not only kept Bedworth's tradition - unique in the United Kingdom - alive, but also lent significant weight to the campaign to move Remembrance Day back to 11 November.

Transport

Road
Bedworth has good transport links being situated immediately north of the M6 motorway at junction 3, with access via several slip roads onto the A444 dual carriageway bypass. The A444 also provides fast access to Nuneaton, the  Ricoh Arena, the Arena Retail Park and northern/central Coventry.

Rail
Bedworth railway station in the town centre is on the Coventry to Nuneaton railway line, and was reopened in 1988 after the original station at the same site was closed in 1965 as part of the Beeching Axe. Historically two more stations were in the vicinity of Bedworth which are now closed: Just south of Bedworth was Hawkesbury Lane railway station, also on the Coventry-Nuneaton line, which also closed in 1965, Just east of Bedworth was Bulkington railway station on the Trent Valley Line which closed in 1931.

Buses
Bus services to the city centre of Coventry are operated competitively by Stagecoach in Warwickshire and National Express Coventry. Stagecoach also provides direct services to Nuneaton, Bulkington, Keresley, Atherstone, Hinckley & Leicester and a direct service to the University Hospital in Walsgrave, Coventry is provided by Arriva Midlands.

Waterways
The Coventry Canal runs along the eastern edge of the town. Just outside Bedworth to the north-east is Marston Junction where the Coventry Canal joins the Ashby Canal. Just to the south-east at Hawkesbury Junction it joins the Oxford Canal.

Tramways
Historically Bedworth was the northern terminus of the Coventry Corporation Tramways system, which operated from the late 19th century until closure in 1940.

Schools

Nicholas Chamberlaine School
Ash Green School

Media

Radio
The local radio stations are:
BBC Coventry & Warwickshire: 94.8FM
Fosse 107: 107.9FM
Free Radio Coventry and Warwickshire (formally known as Mercia Sound and Mercia FM): 97.0FM
Anker Radio – which serves the nearby George Eliot Hospital, but can be heard on 1386AM.
BBC Radio Leicester can be received in the town on 104.9FM.

Written media
The main local newspapers are:
The Nuneaton News (originally known as the Evening News upon launch and then the Heartland Evening News): Serving the whole of north Warwickshire and some border areas in Leicestershire, the paper is owned by Local World. The newspaper is published on weekdays. The Wednesday edition is circulated free throughout the town, whereas the daily paper on Monday, Tuesday, Thursday and Friday are paid. It was founded in 1992, following the decision of the Tribune's publisher to switch to a weekly freesheet.
The Tribune (formerly the People's Tribune (1895), Midland Counties Tribune (1903) and Nuneaton Evening Tribune (1957)): It is owned by Trinity Mirror's Coventry Newspapers (publisher of the Coventry Telegraph). Covering 'northern Warwickshire' (particularly Bedworth, Atherstone & Nuneaton), the free paper is available weekly to collect at many newsagents in the area on a Thursday or Friday. In September 2015 The Tribune ceased publication. The last edition was published on Thursday 24 September.
The Nuneaton Telegraph; a localised sub-edition of the Coventry Telegraph, it was launched in 1992 (when the aforementioned Tribune switched from daily to weekly production).

Television news
The Nuneaton area is covered on regional TV News by:
BBC (West) Midlands Today
ITV News Central

Notable people
Kyle Storer (born 1987), Professional Footballer
Jordan McFarlane-Archer (born 1993), professional footballer.
Nona Bellairs (1824-1897), writer and philanthropist.

 Chris Camwell (born 1998) professional footballer currently playing for Hereford FC of the National League North.

Nicholas Chamberlaine (1632–1715), priest, benefactor.
Pete Doherty, (born 1979) former Libertines front-man, attended Nicholas Chamberlaine School.
Diane Elson, (born 1946) economist, sociologist.
Conrad Keely, (born 1972) of American rock group ...And You Will Know Us by the Trail of Dead was a resident of Bedworth.
Brian Locking, (1938-2020) musician, one time member of The Shadows.
Nick Skelton, (born 1957) winner of a gold medal in London 2012 Olympics, winner of the Hickstead Derby and European showjumping championships.
 Rev Richard Mudge (1718-1763), clergyman, composer and brother of the eminent clockmaker Thomas Mudge, died here.

References

External links

Nuneatonhistory.com – Townscapes of Bedworth & Collycroft
The Bedworth Society
Nuneaton and Bedworth Borough council
The Civic Hall, Bedworth
Nicholas Chamberlaine Trusts

Bedworth Armistice Day

Bedworth archives - Our Warwickshire

 
Towns in Warwickshire
Market towns in Warwickshire
Unparished areas in Warwickshire
Former civil parishes in Warwickshire
Nuneaton and Bedworth